Ego Trip's Miss Rap Supreme is an American reality television series that airs on the VH1 cable network. It is a follow-up to 2007's Ego Trip's The (White) Rapper Show.
In Ego Trip's Miss Rap Supreme, contestants compete to win the title of next great female MC.

The show is hosted by MC Serch and female MC Yo-Yo. It premiered on VH1 in April 2008.

Contestants

Notes
*Lionezz was eliminated on Episode 1, but brought back in Episode 2 after Khia was disqualified.

Call-out order

 The contestant was named Miss Rap Supreme.
 The winning contestant(s) on that week's challenge, making them safe from elimination
 The contestant was named "Miss..." for the week (team MVP)
 The contestant was eliminated
 The contestant was eliminated and later brought back into the competition
 The contestant won the challenge but was eliminated
 The contestant was disqualified.
 
The "Miss..." awards
Week 1: "Miss Representation"
Week 2: "Miss Thang"
Week 3: "Miss Maneater"
Week 4: "Miss Lady of the Stage"
Week 5: "Miss Video Venus"
Week 6: "Miss Popularity"
Week 7: "Miss Con-G-nality"
Week 8: "Miss Rap Supreme"

Episode Notes
Khia was disqualified at the beginning of Episode 2 due to her use of a pre-written song ("Respect Me") for her 16-bar song. Lionezz was brought back as a result.
In episode 7, Chiba admitted to Byata And Rece Steele that she uses pre-written songs in the competition, but stays original when told to do so. This caused even more tension with the girls. All the girls became suspicious of Chiba when everyone stumbled on their raps, but Chiba did not.
Although Chiba won the challenge, she was eliminated in episode 7 after being in the bottom two with Byata.

Celebrity guests
Ghostface Killah
Too Short
John Singleton
Soulja Boy Tell 'Em
Just Blaze
WC
Roxanne Shante
will.i.am
Missy Elliott
Charli Baltimore

See also
Ego Trip (magazine)
Ego Trip's The (White) Rapper Show

References

External links
 Official Website
 
 Audio interview with ego trip's Brent Rollins and Gabriel Alvarez on public radio program The Sound of Young America

2000s American reality television series
VH1 original programming
2008 American television series debuts
2008 American television series endings
English-language television shows
African-American reality television series